Qeshlaq-e Gowmir Chinlu-ye Owrtadagh (also Romanized as Qeshlāq-e Gowmīr Chīnlū-ye Owrtādāgh) is a village in Qeshlaq-e Jonubi Rural District, Qeshlaq Dasht District, Bileh Savar County, Ardabil Province, Iran. At the 2006 census, its population was 125, in 26 families.

References 

Towns and villages in Bileh Savar County